Phyllonorycter trochetellus is a moth of the family Gracillariidae. It is found in Mauritius.

The length of the forewings is 2.75 mm. The forewings are golden ochreous with white markings. The hindwings are light fuscous with a greyish fringe with golden shine. Its wing pattern is indistinguishable from Phyllonorycter ruizivorus.

The larvae feed as leaf miners on Dombeya acutangula and Trochetia blackburniana. Mines have been collected in April and in mid-December.

Etymology
The species' name refers to the name of the host plant.

References

Moths described in 2012
trochetellus
Moths of Mauritius
Endemic fauna of Mauritius

Taxa named by Jurate de Prins
Leaf miners